Prisionera is a telenovela made by Telemundo and Caracol Televisión. This telenovela was aired in 16 countries around the world.

Plot 
Wrongfully accused of a crime she didn't commit, 16-year-old Guadalupe Santos is sentenced to 30 years in jail, while in jail she gives birth to a baby girl who is taken from her by her older sister Milagros. 15 years later she escapes jail and meets with Daniel Moncada who turns out to be the brother of the man she was accused of killing. Searching for Love, Truth and her Daughter, Guadalupe finds herself a Prisoner of life.

Cast

Opening 1 
 Gabriela Spanic as Guadalupe Santos - Main heroine
 Mauricio Islas as Daniel Moncada (I) 1-110 episodes) - Main hero
 Gabriela Roel as Milagros Santos de Salvatierra - Sister of Guadalupe, villain
 Daniel Lugo as Rodolfo Russián -  Lawyer of Rosalía, Killed by Lulu, villain
 Riccardo Dalmacci as Francisco 'Pancho' Salvatierra - Husband of Milagros
 Zully Montero as Rosalía Ríobueno viuda de Moncada - Mother of Daniel, Enrique and Ernesto
 Diana Quijano as Lucero 'Lulú' Ríobueno - Wife of Ernesto, Killed by Cobra, main villain
 Marisela González as Antonia 'Tuerta' Pinzon - Accomplice of Lulú, villain
 Génesis Rodríguez as Libertad Salvatierra Santos - Daughter of Guadalupe
 Yina Vélez as Jennifer Robinson - Alcoholic, girlfriend of Daniel, Killed by Lulu, villain
 César Román as Luis 'Lucho' Villa - Friend of Libertad
 Griselda Noguera as Matilde/Maté - Servant of family Salvatierra
 Gerardo Riverón as Padre Antonio - Reverend friend of family Salvatierra and Moncada
 Martha Mijares as Mercedes Reyes, mother of Adela and Berenice
 Roberto Levermann as Maximo Gallardo - Mexican boyfriend of Monalisa
 William Colmenares as Tatam - Employee dumb of Salvatierra's house
 Carla Rodríguez as Adela Reyes - In love with of Pancho
 Carlos Caballero as Cipriano 'Cobra' Armenteros - Accomplice of Rodolfo, killed by Lulu, villain
 Liz Gallardo as Monalisa García - Servant of family Salvatierra
 Jullye Giliberti as Ignacia 'Nacha' Vergara - Best friend of Guadalupe
 Rebeka Montoya as Patricia 'Patty' Salvatierra - Cousin of Libertad

Opening 2 
 Gabriela Spanic as Guadalupe Santos - Main heroine
 Gabriel Porras as Daniel Moncada (II) 111-180 episodes) - Main hero
 Gabriela Roel as Milagros Santos de Salvatierra - Sister of Guadelupe, villain
 Daniel Lugo as Rodolfo Russián -  Lawyer of Rosalía, Killed by Lulu, villain
 Ricardo Dalmacci as Francisco 'Pancho' Salvatierra - Husband of Milagros
 Zully Montero as Rosalía Ríobueno viuda de Moncada - Mother of Daniel, Enrique and Ernesto
 Diana Quijano as Lucero 'Lulú' Ríobueno - Wife of Ernesto, Killed by Cobra, main villain
 Marisela González as Antonia 'Tuerta' Pinzon - Accomplice of Lulú, villain
 Carlos Caballero as Cipriano 'Cobra' Armenteros - Accomplice of Rodolfo, Killed by Lulu, villain
 Génesis Rodríguez as Libertad Salvatierra Santos - Daughter of Guadalupe
 Alejandro Chabán as Ronaldo 'Rony' Simancas -  Killed by Teodoro "Tedy" Villamizar, villain
 Alfonso Diluca as Florentino 'Tito' Cabello - Servant of family Salvatierra
 César Román as Luis 'Lucho' Villa - Friend of Libertad
 Griselda Noguera as Matilde/Maté - Servant of family Salvatierra
 Gerardo Riverón as Padre Antonio - Reverend friend of family Salvatierra and Moncada
 Félix Loreto as Enrique/Ernesto Riobueno - Husband of Lulú, son of Rosalía, Killed by Lulu (Ernesto)
 Roberto Levermann as Maximo Gallardo - Mexican boyfriend of Monalisa
 William Colmenares as Tatam - Employee dumb of Salvatierra's house
 Carla Rodríguez as Adela Reyes - In love with of Pancho
 Martha Mijares as Mercedes Reyes, mother of Adela and Berenice
 Liz Gallardo as Monalisa García - Servant of family Salvatierra
 Jullye Giliberti as Ignacia 'Nacha' Vergara - Best friend of Guadalupe
 Rebeka Montoya as Patricia 'Patty' Salvatierra - Cousin of Libertad, Friend of Ronnie

Other Cast

International release

External links
 Prisionera official site 
 Telenovela World (bilingual)

2004 telenovelas
2004 American television series debuts
2004 American television series endings
Telemundo telenovelas
Television shows set in Florida
American television series based on Venezuelan television series
Spanish-language American telenovelas